Alessio Benedetti (born 7 April 1997) is an Italian professional footballer who plays as a centre-back for ASD Liventina.

Club career

Vicenza
Born in Motta di Livenza, Veneto region, Benedetti started his career at Veneto club Vicenza Calcio. In May 2013, he received a call-up from Italian Football Federation (FIGC) for a youth tournament that composed of Italian under-16 players. He was assigned in Team C along with fellow Vicenza defender Simone Romio and future Vicenza team-mate Luigi Rizzo (who was signed in January 2015). The tournament was also served as the kickoff event of Italy national under-17 football team for 2013–14 season. However, Benedetti earned a transfer to a higher division after the tournament, but failed to earn any national team call-up.

In summer 2013 Benedetti was signed by the youth team of Serie A club Genoa in a temporary deal, with an option to purchase. At the same time, Vicenza signed Alberto Marchiori from Genoa also in a temporary deal, with an option to purchase. The loan was renewed on 30 July 2014. Benedetti was the member of Genoa's under-17 youth team in the first season and the under-19 reserves in the second season.

Torino
In summer 2015, shortly after he was returned from Genoa, Benedetti was signed by another Serie A club Torino in a definitive deal for €30,000 transfer fee in a 3-year contract.  Benedetti spent  seasons with Torino's reserves, with the last 6 months as an overage player. He also participated in 2015–16 UEFA Youth League for the Turin-based club.

Benedetti left for Lega Pro club Taranto on 1 February 2017. Benedetti made his professional debut against Melfi on 23 April, as one of the starting defenders.

On 4 August 2017 Benedetti joined Carrarese.

Pro Vercelli
On 2 September 2019, he joined Pro Vercelli.

Liventina
On 30 July 2021, he joined Eccellenza club ASD Liventina.

References

External links
 

1997 births
Living people
People from Motta di Livenza
Footballers from Veneto
Italian footballers
Association football central defenders
Serie C players
L.R. Vicenza players
Genoa C.F.C. players
Torino F.C. players
Taranto F.C. 1927 players
Carrarese Calcio players
U.S. Città di Pontedera players
F.C. Pro Vercelli 1892 players
Sportspeople from the Province of Treviso